CTJ may refer to:

 Calvin Theological Journal, an academic journal published by Calvin Theological Seminary
 Citizens for Tax Justice, a Washington, D.C.-based think tank and advocacy group
 CTJ, the FAA LID code for West Georgia Regional Airport, Carrollton, Georgia
 CTJ, the IATA code for Caserta railway station, Campania, Italy